The following is a list of events and releases that happened in 2019 in Latin music. The list covers events and releases from Latin regions from the Spanish- and Portuguese-speaking areas of Latin America and the Iberian Peninsula.

Events

January–March
February 10 – The 61st Annual Grammy Awards are held at the Staples Center in Los Angeles, California.
Sincera by Argentine singer and lyricist Claudia Brant wins Best Latin Pop Album.
Aztlán by Mexican band Zoé wins Best Latin Rock, Urban or Alternative Album.
¡México Por Siempre! by Mexican singer Luis Miguel wins Best Regional Mexican Music Album.
Anniversary by American-based orchestra Spanish Harlem Orchestra wins Best Tropical Latin Album.
Back to the Sunset by Cuban-American musician Dafnis Prieto and his band wins Best Latin Jazz Album.
February 21 – The 31st Annual Lo Nuestro Awards are held at the American Airlines Arena in Miami, Florida. Puerto Rican singer Ozuna is the biggest winner, with nine awards. The Album of the Year category was removed due to a tendency in Latin pop music about releasing non-album singles.
Colombian singer J Balvin wins Artist of the Year.
"Me Niego" by Reik featuring Ozuna and Wisin wins Song of the Year and Collaboration of the Year.
Brazilian singer Roberto Carlos receives the Excellence Award. Puerto Rican rapper Daddy Yankee and American band Intocable receive the Lifetime Achievement Award.
February 25 – "Despacito" by Luis Fonsi featuring Daddy Yankee becomes the first YouTube video to reach six billion views on the site.
March 5 – The 27th Annual ASCAP Latin Awards are held at the El San Juan Hotel in San Juan, Puerto Rico.
"I Like It" by Cardi B, Bad Bunny, and J Balvin wins Song of the Year.
Daddy Yankee wins Songwriter/Artist of the Year. Colombian singer Maluma wins Songwriter of the Year.
Puerto Rican singer, lyricist and producer Draco Rosa receives the Vanguard Award. Dominican singer Milly Quezada receives the Heritage Award.
March 14 – The 6th iHeartRadio Music Awards are held at the Microsoft Theater in Los Angeles, California.
Bad Bunny wins Latin Artist of the Year.
Vibras by J Balvin wins Latin Album of the Year.
"X" by Nicky Jam and J Balvin wins Latin Song of the Year.
March 20 – The 26th Annual BMI Latin Awards are held at the Beverly Wilshire Hotel in Beverly Hills, California.
"Mi Gente" by J Balvin and Willy William wins Contemporary Latin Song of the Year.
Ozuna and Puerto Rican manager and songwriter Vicente Saavedra win Contemporary Latin Songwriter of the Year.
Argentine producer Sebastian Krys receives the Champion Award. Mexican singer Mario Quintero Lara, vocalist of Los Tucanes de Tijuana, receives the President's Award.
March 21In response to the lack of nominees for reggaeton and Latin trap albums at the Grammy Awards, Telemundo launched the Premios Tu Música Urbano in Puerto Rico. These are the second Latin urban-oriented awards, following the People's Choice Reggaeton and Urban Awards, which lasted from 2005 to 2007. The 1st Premios Tu Música Urbano are held at the José Miguel Agrelot Coliseum in San Juan, Puerto Rico. Ozuna is the biggest winner with six awards.
Ozuna wins Artist of the Year.
Aura by Ozuna wins Album of the Year.
"Dura" by Daddy Yankee wins Song of the Year.
March 27 – The Recording Industry Association of America (RIAA) reports that the Latin music industry in the United States grew 18% in 2018 to $413 million in revenue, with streaming comprising 93% of its market. Revenues from on-demand and ad-supported services including YouTube, Vevo and Spotify grew 34%. Latin music sales comprise 6% of its total revenue in the United States. Sales from digital downloads and physical albums decreased 23% and 63% in comparison to 2017, respectively.

April–June
April 2 – The International Federation of the Phonographic Industry (IFPI) reports that Latin America shows the highest regional growth for a fourth consecutive year, with a revenue increase of 16.8%.
"Despacito" by Luis Fonsi and Daddy Yankee featuring Justin Bieber is the best-selling Spanish-language song of 2018 and the sixth overall, with 11.8 million sales plus track-equivalent streams in the world.
April 13 – J Balvin becomes the first ever reggaeton-singing act to ever perform at Coachella. Other Spanish-singing acts include Los Tucanes de Tijuana, Bad Bunny, Rosalía, Mon Laferte and Javiera Mena among others.
April 25 – The 26th Annual Billboard Latin Music Awards are held at the Mandalay Bay Events Center in Las Vegas, Nevada. Ozuna breaks the record of most wins in a single edition of the awards, with 11.
Ozuna wins Artist of the Year.
"Te Boté" by Casper Mágico, Nio García, Darell, Nicky Jam, Ozuna, and Bad Bunny wins Hot Latin Song of the Year.
Odisea by Ozuna wins Top Latin Album of the Year.
Dominican musician Juan Luis Guerra receives the Lifetime Achievement Award.
May 1 – The 26th Annual Billboard Music Awards are held at the MGM Grand Garden Arena in Las Vegas, Nevada.
Ozuna wins Top Latin Artist.
Aura by Ozuna wins Top Latin Album.
"Te Boté" by Casper Mágico, Nio García, Darell, Nicky Jam, Ozuna, and Bad Bunny wins Top Latin Song.
May 13 – The 4th Heat Latin Music Awards are held at the Hard Rock Hotel and Casino in Punta Cana, Dominican Republic.
J Balvin and Karol G win Best Male and Female Artist, respectively. Zion & Lennox win Best Group or Band.
"Pineapple" by Karol G wins Best Video.
"Amantes" by Greeicy featuring Mike Bahía wins Best Collaboration.
May 14 – The 21st Premios Gardel take place at Ángel Bustelo Auditorium in Mendoza to celebrate the best in Argentinian music.
Prender un Fuego by Marilina Bertoldi wins Album of the Year.
"Sin Querer Queriendo" by Lali featuring Mau y Ricky wins Song of the Year.
"Studio 2" by Escalandrum wins Record of the Year.
Destino San Javier win Best New Artist.
May 18 – J Balvin becomes he first ever reggaeton-singing act to ever perform on Saturday Night Live.

July–September
July 3 Seven years after Jenni Rivera's death, "Aparentemente Bien" was posthumously released by Rivera's family on what would have been her 50th birthday. The song was found in a hard drive by Rivera's brother Juan.
July 9—13The 20th Latin Alternative Music Conference is held in New York City.
July 17Following a series of scandals involving Puerto Rican governor Ricardo Rosselló, Puerto Rican recording artists Residente, ILE, and Bad Bunny released "Afilando Los Cuchillos" as a protest to corruption in the Puerto Rican government. Bad Bunny also postponed his tour in Europe to join the protests.
August 3J Balvin becomes the first ever Latin artist to headline Lollapalooza Chicago.
August 26The music video for "Con Altura" by Rosalía and J Balvin featuring El Guincho, directed by Director X, wins the MTV Video Music Award for Best Latin Video. Rosalía became the first ever Spanish act to ever win a VMA. "Con Altura" also won the Best Choreography category.

October–December

 November 3 – The 26th MTV Europe Music Awards take place at the FIBES Conference and Exhibition Centre in Seville.
 Pabllo Vittar wins Best Brazilian Act.
 Mon Laferte wins Best Latin America North Act.
 Sebastián Yatra wins Best Latin America Central Act.
 J Mena wins Best Latin America South Act.
 Fernando Daniel wins Best Portuguese Act.
 Lola Indigo wins Best Spanish Act.
November 8 – The 14th LOS40 Music Awards take place at the WiZink Center in Madrid.
 Rosalía wins Best Spanish Artist.
 Nuclear by Leiva wins Best Spanish Album.
 "Lo Siento" by Beret wins Best Spanish Song.
 "De Tus Ojos" by Vanesa Martín wins Best Spanish Video.
November 14The 20th Annual Latin Grammy Awards are held at the MGM Grand Garden Arena in Las Vegas, Nevada:
"Mi Persona Favorita" by Alejandro Sanz and Camila Cabello wins Record of the Year.
El Mal Querer by Rosalía wins Album of the Year.
"Calma" by Pedro Capó wins Song of the Year.
Venezuelan singer Nella wins Best New Artist.

Number-ones albums and singles by country

List of Billboard Argentina Hot 100 number-one singles of 2019
List of number-one albums of 2019 (Mexico)
List of number-one songs of 2019 (Mexico)

List of number-one albums of 2019 (Portugal)
List of number-one albums of 2019 (Spain)
List of number-one singles of 2019 (Spain)
List of number-one Billboard Latin Albums from the 2010s
List of number-one Billboard Hot Latin Songs of 2019
List of number-one Billboard Regional Mexican Songs of 2019

Spanish-language songs on the Billboard Hot 100
In 2019, a total of 20 Spanish-language songs have debuted in the Billboard Hot 100 and other four charted from the previous year. From the Latin songs released in 2019, "Con Calma" by Daddy Yankee and Katy Perry featuring Snow was the highest-peaking of the year, having reached number 22. "Vete" by Bad Bunny became the highest debut in the history of the Hot 100 for a completely-Spanish-language song by a solo act with no accompanying artists.

Sales and streaming

United States
In July 2019, Nielsen SoundScan reported that equivalent album units for Latin music in the United States totaled 10.2 million in the tracking period of January 4 through June 20, 2019.

Best-selling albums (equivalent units)

Best-selling albums (traditional sales)

Best-selling songs

Most-streamed songs

Awards

Latin music awards
2019 Lo Nuestro Awards
2019 Billboard Latin Music Awards
2019 Latin American Music Awards
2019 Latin Grammy Awards
2019 Heat Latin Music Awards
2019 MTV Millennial Awards

Awards with Latin categories
2019 Billboard Music Awards
2019 Grammy Awards
2019 iHeartRadio Music Awards
2019 MTV Video Music Awards
2019 Teen Choice Awards

Albums released

First-quarter

January

February

March

Second quarter

April

May

June

Third quarter

July

August

September

Fourth quarter

October

November

December

Dates unknown

Year-End

Performance in the United States

Albums
The following is a list of the 10 best-performing Latin albums in the United States in the tracking period of November 24, 2018 through November 16, 2019, according to Billboard and Nielsen SoundScan, which compiles data from traditional sales and album-equivalent units. Equivalent album units are based on album sales, track equivalent albums (10 tracks sold equals one album sale), and streaming equivalent albums (3,750 ad-supported streams or 1,250 paid subscription streams equals one album sale).

Songs
The following is a list of the 10 best-performing Latin songs in the United States in the tracking period of November 24, 2018 through November 16, 2019, according to Billboard and Nielsen SoundScan, which compiles data from streaming activity, digital sales and radio airplay.

Airplay in Latin America
The following is a list of the 10 most-played radio songs in Latin America in the tracking period of December 17, 2018 through December 1, 2019, according to Monitor Latino.

By country
The following is a list of the most-played radio songs in Latin America in the tracking period of December 17, 2018 through December 1, 2019 by country, according to Monitor Latino.

By artist
The following is a list of the five most-played artists in Latin America among the top 100 songs from the tracking period of December 17, 2018 through December 1, 2019, according to Monitor Latino.

Performance in non-Spanish-speaking countries
The following is a list of the best-performing Latin songs in non-Spanish-speaking countries in 2019 by nation.

Deaths
January 28Yoskar Sarante, 48, Dominican Republic bachata singer (complications from lung disease)
February 7, 29, Colombian reggaeton musician (shot)
February 10Juanjo Domínguez, 67, Argentine musician
February 24Marcos Antonio Urbay, 90, Cuban musician
February 26, 71, Brazilian musician, composer and record producer (oral cancer)
March 11, 76, Brazilian singer
April 4Alberto Cortez, 79, Argentine singer and songwriter (gastric haemorrhage)
April 5Pastor López, 74, Venezuelan singer-songwriter
April 30Beth Carvalho, 72, Brazilian samba singer
June 8Andre Matos, 47, Brazilian singer (heart attack)
June 22, 61, Brazilian drummer (RPM), pulmonary fibrosis.
July 6João Gilberto, 88, Brazilian singer-songwriter and guitarist, pioneer of bossa nova music style.
August 21Celso Piña, 66, Mexican cumbia singer, composer and accordionist, heart attack.
September 4, 89, Brazilian MPB and samba singer, pneumonia.
September 8Camilo Sesto, 72, Spanish singer-songwriter ("Algo Más", "Amor Mío, ¿Qué Me Has Hecho?"), heart failure.
September 15Roberto Leal, 67, Portuguese-Brazilian singer, skin cancer.
September 19María Rivas, 59, Venezuelan Latin jazz singer, composer and painter, cancer.
September 28José José, 71, Mexican singer ("El Triste", "Como Tú") and actor (Gavilán o Paloma), pancreatic cancer.
October 24Walter Franco, 74, Brazilian singer and composer
November 22Gugu Liberato, 60, Brazilian singer and television presenter (injuries from fall)
December 22Ubirajara Penacho dos Reis, 85, Brazilian musician (Programa do Jô), stroke.
December 28Amy Patterson, 107, Argentine composer, singer and poet.

Notes

References

 
Latin music by year